Shemar Franklin Moore (born April 20, 1970) is an American actor. His notable roles include Malcolm Winters on The Young and the Restless (1994–2005), Derek Morgan on Criminal Minds (2005–2016), and the lead role of Sergeant II Daniel "Hondo" Harrelson on S.W.A.T. (2017–present) all on CBS. Moore was also the third permanent host of Soul Train, from 1999 to 2003.

Moore has won eight NAACP Image Awards as well as the 2000 Daytime Emmy Award for Outstanding Supporting Actor in a Drama Series for his work on The Young and the Restless. He was nominated for a People's Choice Award in 2016 for his work on Criminal Minds.

Early life
Moore was born in Oakland, California, the son of Marilyn Wilson, a business consultant, and Sherrod Moore. Moore's father was African-American and his mother, who was born in the Roxbury neighborhood of Boston, Massachusetts, was of Irish and French-Canadian descent. His mother, who had a degree in mathematics, worked as a teacher in Bahrain and Denmark. Moore moved with her to Denmark as an infant, and then to Bahrain when he was four, where he attended a British private school until the age of seven. His grandmother is from Quebec City, Canada. Moore cites civil unrest, interracial relationships being taboo, and racism in the U.S. in the 1970s as part of the reason his mother moved abroad with him. Returning to the U.S. in 1977, the family moved to Chico, California, where his mother worked at a clinic, before later moving to Palo Alto. A gifted and talented child, Moore attended The Nueva School in Hillsborough, California before graduating from Gunn High School in Palo Alto. Moore was awarded an athletic scholarship to attend Santa Clara University where he played varsity baseball as both a pitcher and an outfielder all four years. He holds a Bachelor of Arts degree in communications with a minor in Theater Arts.

Career

Acting

Moore is best known for his role as Malcolm Winters on the CBS television soap opera The Young and the Restless for more than a decade. In November 2004, he returned to The Young and the Restless after originally planning to leave the show, but after a few months he dropped back to recurring status and left in September 2005. In 2007, he said, "My time is done on Y&R. I did eight solid years as Malcolm."

During his time on The Young and the Restless,  Moore was the host of the syndicated version of the series Soul Train from 1999 until 2003, and he appeared in the 2001 feature film The Brothers. He portrayed Detective Jesse Reese on the television series Birds of Prey from 2002 to 2003. Moore played Emery Simms in the 2004 film Motives alongside Vivica Fox and Golden Brooks, and had a supporting role in the film Diary of a Mad Black Woman. He also appeared in the romantic comedy The Seat Filler with Kelly Rowland and Duane Martin.

In 2005, Moore began playing Derek Morgan in Criminal Minds beginning with the first season's seventh episode in which he was cast  and he exited the role after 11 seasons and 251 episodes in episode 18 of season 11, "A Beautiful Disaster", in March 2016.

In February 2017, it was announced that Moore would star in CBS's new series titled S.W.A.T., based on the 2003 film and 1975 television series of the same name. The show was renewed for a fourth season in 2020. On December 24, 2020, amidst the COVID-19 pandemic, Moore tested positive for the infection, but said he professed to "feel fine". After contracting and recovering from the disease, Moore officially revealed that he is COVID-free, ready to get back on set and announcing that the show was renewed for a fifth season in 2021.

In June 2021, it was announced that Moore had joined the cast of Sonic the Hedgehog 2, as Randall Handel. He also stars as the "Unnecessary Action Hero" in a series of commercials for Paycom.

Modelling
Moore worked as a model during his college years. He is signed to DNA Model Management in New York City. Moore appeared on the March 2009 issue of Men's Fitness magazine.

Personal life
Moore dated soccer player Shawna Gordon from 2014 to 2015. In 2018, he dated Quantico actress Anabelle Acosta. On January 9, 2023, he announced the due date of his first child with his girlfriend, Jesiree Dizon, was February 8, 2023. The couple's daughter, Frankie, was born January 24, 2023, weighing 7.1 pounds and measuring 20 inches.

Moore formed a retail clothing company known as Baby Girl LLC. The company's profits are used to help fight multiple sclerosis, a disease Moore's mother had. The organization's name is derived from a phrase used by Moore's character, Derek Morgan, on Criminal Minds. In 2016, actor Keith Tisdell pleaded guilty to grand theft charges after stealing more than $60,000 from Baby Girl LLC. Tisdell agreed to repay the amount.

Filmography

Film

Television

Awards and nominations

References

External links

 Biography at CBS - Criminal Minds
 
 

1970 births
20th-century American male actors
21st-century American male actors
African-American male actors
African-American male models
African-American television personalities
American male film actors
American male models
American male soap opera actors
American male television actors
American people of French-Canadian descent
American people of Irish descent
Daytime Emmy Award for Outstanding Supporting Actor in a Drama Series winners
Daytime Emmy Award winners
Gunn High School alumni
Living people
Male actors from California
Male actors from Oakland, California
Male models from California
Santa Clara University alumni
Soul Train